Andrew Lapthorne defeated David Wagner in the final, 7–5, 6–2 to win the quad singles wheelchair tennis title at the 2014 US Open.

Lucas Sithole was the defending champion, but was eliminated in the round-robin stage.

Draw

Final

Round robin
Standings are determined by: 1. number of wins; 2. number of matches; 3. in two-players-ties, head-to-head records; 4. in three-players-ties, percentage of sets won, or of games won; 5. steering-committee decision.

External links
 Draw

Wheelchair Quad Singles
U.S. Open, 2014 Quad Singles